The Khazar Lankaran 2015-16 season is Khazar Lankaran's twelfth Azerbaijan Premier League season, and their first season under manager Elbrus Mammadov. They will compete in the Azerbaijan Cup and the League.

Squad

Transfers

Summer

In:

Out:

Winter

In:

Out:

Friendlies

Competitions

Azerbaijan Premier League

Results summary

Results

League table

Azerbaijan Cup

Squad statistics

Appearances and goals

|-
|colspan="14"|Players away from Khazar Lankaran on loan:
|-
|colspan="14"|Players who appeared for Khazar Lankaran no longer at the club:

|}

Goal scorers

Disciplinary record

Notes 

Qarabağ have played their home games at the Tofiq Bahramov Stadium since 1993 due to the ongoing situation in Quzanlı.

References

External links 
Khazar Lankaran at Soccerway.com

Khazar Lankaran FK seasons
Azerbaijani football clubs 2015–16 season